"Blue Melody" is a short story by J. D. Salinger, first published in the September 1948 issue of Cosmopolitan.  The tragic tale of an African-American jazz singer, the story was inspired by the life of Bessie Smith and was originally titled "Needle on a Scratchy Phonograph Record".  Cosmopolitan changed the title to "Blue Melody" without Salinger's consent, a "slick" magazine tactic that was one of the reasons the author decided, in the late forties, that "he wanted to publish only in The New Yorker."

References

Short stories by J. D. Salinger
1948 short stories
Works originally published in Cosmopolitan (magazine)
Cultural depictions of Bessie Smith